RTL1 (retrotransposon like 1) is a retrotransposon derived protein coding gene. It is also known as PEG11 and is a paternally expressed imprinted gene, part of genomic imprinting. RTL1 plays an important role in the maintenance of fetal capillaries and is expressed in high quantities during late stage of fetal development. The expression of this gene is important for the development of the placenta, the fetus-maternal interface. Because the placenta is the first organ to form during the development of an embryo, problems in its establishment and biological role lead to complications during gestation. This organ maintains the fetus throughout the pregnancy and is therefore sensitive to disruptions. Studies in mice suggest that disruption of the RTL1 concentration, whether increasing or decreasing the amount of this protein coding gene, can lead to serious errors in the conservation of placental fetal capillaries. RTL1 knockout mice have shown obstruction in fetal development along with late fetal/neonatal death. Studies from sheep homologs suggest that high expression levels of RTL1 can lead to skeletal muscle hypertrophy This is due to over-expression patterns in the paternal allele specific gene.

References 

Genes